Reinhard Jozef Petrus Meulensteen (born 25 March 1964) is a Dutch former footballer and coach who is currently assistant coach of the Australia national soccer team. He spent the early parts of his career working in the Netherlands before taking up managerial roles with the Qatari youth team, as well as clubs Al-Ittihad and Al-Sadd. He then spent 12 years, split either side of a year stint at Brøndby, with Premier League side Manchester United in various non-managerial capacities. Following his departure from the club in 2013, Meulensteen was in charge for short spells at Anzhi Makhachkala, Fulham and Maccabi Haifa.

Managerial career

Early career
While still playing, Meulensteen became a youth coach at NEC Nijmegen.

In June 2006, he signed a three-year contract with Danish club Brøndby IF to become manager of the club, but resigned after six months.

On 18 January 2007, Meulensteen rejoined Manchester United as technical skills development coach mainly to work with the first team. After the departure in July 2008 of their assistant manager, Carlos Queiroz to Portugal as their national team manager, Meulensteen took over as first team coach, with Mike Phelan being promoted to assistant manager. Both assumed their new roles on 13 August 2008.

During his time as first-team coach, he helped Sir Alex Ferguson secure the Premier League title in 2008–09, 2010–11 and 2012–13; the Community Shield in 2008, 2010, 2011, the League Cup in 2008–09 and 2009–10; the UEFA Champions League in 2007–08 and FIFA Club World Cup in 2008.

Manchester United confirmed his departure from the club on 26 June 2013, after incoming manager David Moyes decided to bring in his own coaching team.

On 1 July 2013, Meulensteen signed a contract with FC Anzhi Makhachkala joining Guus Hiddink as an assistant coach. Hiddink left Anzhi after only two games into the 2013–14 Russian Premier League season, allowing Meulensteen to step up to head coach. After 16 days in charge, Meulensteen was sacked and replaced by Gadzhi Gadzhiyev.

Fulham
Meulensteen returned to England in November 2013 to take up the position of head coach under Martin Jol at Fulham. Less than three weeks later, Jol was sacked by Fulham after five consecutive league defeats, with Meulensteen taking over as manager. His first match as Fulham manager was a 2–1 loss to Tottenham Hotspur on 4 December, where Ashkan Dejagah scored the only goal for Meulensteen's side. Fulham won their first match under Meulensteen days later on 8 December, beating Aston Villa 2–0 with goals from Steve Sidwell and Dimitar Berbatov. On 14 February 2014, Fulham hired Felix Magath to replace Meulensteen as manager, sacking Meulensteen four days later.

In November 2014, he was hired as a consultant by the Philadelphia Union from Major League Soccer.

Maccabi Haifa
On 9 August 2016, Meulensteen was presented as head coach by Maccabi Haifa from Israeli Premier League. His appointment lasted just over six months, and then resigned as head coach on 13 February 2017.

Kerala Blasters
On 14 July 2017, Meulensteen was appointed as head coach of Indian Super League side Kerala Blasters. The club parted ways with Meulensteen after poor start of the season. He resigned as head coach on 2 January 2018.

Personal life
Meulensteen's daughter Pien is a television presenter and reporter in the UK,  whilst his son Melle is also a footballer.

References

External links

Brøndby IF profile

1964 births
Living people
People from Boxmeer
Dutch footballers
Association football midfielders
Dutch football managers
Dutch expatriate football managers
Manchester United F.C. non-playing staff
Al Sadd SC managers
Al-Gharafa SC managers
FC Anzhi Makhachkala managers
Fulham F.C. non-playing staff
Fulham F.C. managers
Maccabi Haifa F.C. managers
Kerala Blasters FC head coaches
Premier League managers
Israeli Premier League managers
Expatriate football managers in Denmark
Expatriate football managers in Qatar
Expatriate football managers in Russia
Expatriate football managers in England
Expatriate football managers in Israel
Indian Super League head coaches
Danish Superliga managers
Dutch expatriate sportspeople in Denmark
Dutch expatriate sportspeople in India
Dutch expatriate sportspeople in Russia
Dutch expatriate sportspeople in Israel
Dutch expatriate sportspeople in Qatar
Dutch expatriate sportspeople in England
Footballers from North Brabant
NEC Nijmegen players
NEC Nijmegen non-playing staff
Dutch expatriate sportspeople in Australia